Enrico Berrè (born 10 November 1992) is an Italian right-handed sabre fencer, two-time team European champion, 2015 team world champion, and 2021 team Olympic silver medalist.

Medal Record

Olympic Games

World Championship

European Championship

Grand Prix

World Cup

Biography
Berrè began fencing at SS Lazio Scherma Ariccia, first learning foil with maestra Matilde Lerro, then switching to sabre with maestro Vincenzo Castrucci. He later transferred to Club Scherma Roma ASD. He took on international competition in 2008. He won the 2010 Junior European Championships in Lobnya.

Amongst seniors, his first significant result was a bronze medal in the 2013 European Championships. He earned a team gold medal in the same competition. In the World Championships that same year, he made his way to the quarter-finals before being defeated 4–15 by Romania's Tiberiu Dolniceanu.

In the 2013–14 season, Berrè won his first World Cup podium with a bronze in Padova, followed by another bronze in the Budapest Grand Prix, and a gold medal in the Glaive d'Asparoukh at Plovdiv. He took the gold both in the individual and team event at the Italian national championships. In the European Championships he was stopped 13–15 in the quarter-finals by Russia's Aleksey Yakimenko, who eventually won the competition. He took his revenge in the team event by beating Russia 45–44 and came away with a second consecutive team gold.

Berrè studied political science at the Università degli Studi Niccolò Cusano. Since 2011 he is a member of GS Fiamme Gialle, the sports section of the Guardia di Finanza.

References

External links

Profile at the European Fencing Championships

Italian male sabre fencers
Living people
1992 births
Fencers from Rome
Fencers at the 2020 Summer Olympics
Olympic fencers of Italy
Medalists at the 2020 Summer Olympics
Olympic medalists in fencing
Olympic silver medalists for Italy